Michela Miti (born Michela Macaluso; June 12, 1963) is an Italian actress and television presenter.

In the years 1979–80 she hosted the first edition of the Italian kid television show 3,2,1 … contatto!.

She became renowned for her nude appearance in Italian sexy comedies. She acted in movies along with Alvaro Vitali and Renzo Montagnani. 
She appeared on the cover of adult magazines Playmen and Blitz.

Filmography
 Gialloparma (1999) as Franca Gherardi
 Mortacci (1989) as Bartender
 Delitti (1987)
 Dolce pelle di Angela (1986 ) as Angela
 Sogni e bisogni (TV mini-series) (1985) as the seducer
 Questo e quello (1983)  as Girlfriend of Giulio
 Vieni avanti cretino (1982) directed by Luciano Salce as  Carmela
 Biancaneve & Co. (1982) as Snowhite
 W la foca (1982)  as  Marisa
 Pierino Strikes Again (1982)  as the teacher
 I figli... so' pezzi 'e core (1981) as Mariastella
 Pierino contro tutti (1981) La Supplente
 Cream Horn (1981)

Notes

External links
 

1963 births
Living people
Italian television presenters
Actresses from Rome
People of Sicilian descent
Italian women television presenters